Trouble at Melody Mesa is a 1949 American  Western film directed by W. Merle Connell.

Cast

External links
 
 

1949 films
1949 Western (genre) films
American Western (genre) films
American black-and-white films
1940s English-language films
1940s American films